Aaron E. Wasserman (October 11, 1920 – July 5, 2015) was an American food scientist. He was the editor-in-chief of the Institute of Food Technologists' (IFT) Journal of Food Science (JFS) from 1981 to 1990.

Biography 

A Pennsylvania native, Wasserman earned his B.S. in 1942 from the University of the Sciences in Philadelphia. He then worked for Merck and Company, and later with the United States Department of Agriculture's (USDA) Agricultural Research Service (ARS) before his retirement in the late 1970s or early 1980s. During the same period Dr. Wasserman's Lab at USDA outside of Philadelphia pioneered the area of nitrosamine formation in cured meats.

Wasserman was named a fellow of the Institute of Food Technologists in 1979. Wasserman served as editor-in-chief of the Journal of Food Science from 1981 to 1990.

Aaron Wasserman retired to the Philadelphia area, and died of natural cause on 5 July 2015.

Selected works
 
 
 
 
 Wasserman, A.E. and J.W. Hampton. (1960). "Whey Utilization III. Oxygen Absorption Rates and the Growth of Saccharomyces fragillis in Several Propagators." Applied Microbiology. 8(5): 293-297.
 Wasserman, A.E. and W.J. Hopkins. (1958). "Dissimilation of C14-labeled Glucose by Serratia marcescens." Journal of Bacteriology. 75(4): 492-493.

Awards 

1990: Institute of Food Technologists' Calvert L. Willey Award for his service as editor of JFS

References

1920 births
2015 deaths
American food scientists
American microbiologists
Fellows of the Institute of Food Technologists
Scientists from Philadelphia
University of the Sciences alumni